The Fourth Wall is a Big Finish Productions audio drama based on the long-running British science fiction television series Doctor Who.

Plot 
Broadcast from planet Transmission, Trans-Gal Media Productions presents: Laser.  Jack Laser battles his nemesis, the evil Lord Krarn, and the army of porcine Warmongers.  The fate of the entire universe hangs in the balance.  Along the way, Laser must also rescue the beautiful Jancey, as well as the Doctor's new companion, Flip.

Cast 
The Doctor – Colin Baker
Flip Jackson – Lisa Greenwood
Augustus Scullop – Julian Wadham
Dr Helen Shepherd – Yasmin Bannerman
Nick Kenton / Jack Laser – Hywel Morgan
Matthew Howland / Lord Krarn – Martin Hutson
Olivia Sayle / Jancey – Tilly Gaunt
Chimbly / Head Warmonger – Kim Wall
Junior / Warmonger – Henry Devas

References

External links
The Fourth Wall

2012 audio plays
Sixth Doctor audio plays